The 1949 Campeonato Paulista da Primeira Divisão, organized by the Federação Paulista de Futebol, was the 48th season of São Paulo's top professional football league. São Paulo won the title for the 6th time. Comercial was relegated and the top scorer was São Paulo's Friaça with 24 goals.

Championship
The championship was disputed in a double-round robin system, with the team with the most points winning the title and the team with the fewest points being relegated.

Top Scores

References

Campeonato Paulista seasons
Paulista